Olimp may refer to:
Olimp (organization), a Polish anti-Nazi organization in Wrocław during World War II
Olimp (brand), brand of reel-to-reel tape recorder
Olimp, Romania, a summer resort in Romania on the Black Sea
Olimp, Belgrade, neighbourhood of Zvezdara, Belgrade, Serbia
Olimp-2, football stadium in Rostov-on-Don, Russia
JFK Olimps/RFS, known as Olimps, Latvian football club
FC Olimp Comrat, Moldovan football club

See also
Olymp (disambiguation)